Richárd Nagy (born 8 April 1994) is a Hungarian professional footballer who plays for Paksi FC.

Club statistics

Updated to games played as of 15 May 2021.

References

External links

1994 births
Living people
Footballers from Budapest
Hungarian footballers
Association football midfielders
Vác FC players
Dorogi FC footballers
Kaposvári Rákóczi FC players
Paksi FC players
Nemzeti Bajnokság I players